Vijitha is a Sinhalese masculine given name. It may refer to:

 Vijitha Amerasekera, Sri Lankan athlete
 Vijitha Berugoda, a Sri Lankan politician
 Vijitha Herath, Sri Lankan politician 
 Vijitha Meddegoda, Sri Lankan navy officer
 Vijitha Rohana, Sri Lankan sailor

Sinhalese masculine given names